Pyinsarupa (also spelt pyinsa rupa;), also known as phaya luang, is a chimeric animal made of an elephant, bullock, horse, white carp (ငါးကြင်း) and tonaya (တိုးနရား, a mythical horned leodragon), or alternately lion, elephant, water buffalo, white carp and hamsa. The creature is commonly featured in traditional Burmese hsaing waing orchestras, and serves as the logo of Myanmar's flagship air carrier, Myanmar Airways International.

See also

Mythical creatures in Burmese folklore
List of hybrid creatures in folklore
Hatsadiling
Nawarupa
Makara

References

Mythological hybrids
Burmese legendary creatures